Luis Grijalva (born 10 April 1999) is a Guatemalan-American long-distance runner. Born in Guatemala, he attended Armijo High School in Fairfield, California, where he recorded high school personal bests of 4:02 in the mile and 8:46 for 2 miles. He became a standout runner for Northern Arizona University and qualified for the 2020 Summer Olympics in the 5000 m with his time of 13:13.14 at the 2021 NCAA Division I Outdoor Track and Field Championships.

Grijavala moved to the United States with his family when he was one year old. He is a DACA recipient and required an advanced re-entry permit to attend the Olympics in Tokyo.  In 2022 he qualified for the World Athletics Championships in Eugene, Oregon, finishing 4th in the 5000 meter final with a time of 13:10.44.

Personal bests

See Also 

 Luis Grijalva Profile at World Athletics

References

1999 births
Living people
Guatemalan male middle-distance runners
Guatemalan male long-distance runners
Northern Arizona Lumberjacks men's track and field athletes
Guatemalan emigrants to the United States
DACA recipients
Sportspeople from Guatemala City
Olympic athletes of Guatemala
Athletes (track and field) at the 2020 Summer Olympics
Northern Arizona Lumberjacks men's cross country runners
People from Fairfield, Alabama